Melrose may refer to:

Places

United Kingdom
 Melrose, Scottish Borders, a town in the Scottish Borders, Scotland
 Melrose Abbey, ruined monastery
 Melrose RFC, rugby club

Australia
 Melrose, Queensland, a locality in the South Burnett Region
Melrose, Queensland (Southern Downs Region), a neighbourhood in Killarney
 Melrose, South Australia, a town in the southern Flinders Ranges
 Melrose, Tasmania, a locality in the North-West Region
 Melrose Park, South Australia, a suburb of Adelaide

Canada
 Melrose, Hastings County, Ontario, a community in the township of Tyendinaga
 Melrose, Middlesex County, Ontario, a community in the township of Middlesex Centre
 Melrose, Nova Scotia
 Melrose, New Brunswick
 Melrose, Newfoundland and Labrador
 Melrose, Nova Scotia

Mauritius
 Melrose, Mauritius, a village in Mauritius

New Zealand
 Melrose, New Zealand, a suburb in the Eastern Ward of Wellington City

South Africa
 Melrose, Gauteng, a suburb of Johannesburg
 Melrose Estate, Gauteng, a suburb of Johannesburg
 Melrose House, historic mansion in Pretoria
 Melrose North, Gauteng, a suburb of Johannesburg

United States
 Melrose Avenue, a major street running through Los Angeles and West Hollywood, California
 Melrose District, a neighborhood in Phoenix, Arizona on the border of the Encanto and Alhambra urban villages.
 Melrose, Oakland, California
 Melrose, California, former name of Cherokee, Nevada County, California
 Melrose, Connecticut, a village in East Windsor
 Melrose, Florida, an unincorporated town
 Melrose, Iowa, a city
 Melrose, Louisiana, a village
 Melrose Plantation, a plantation in Natchitoches, Louisiana
 Melrose, Maryland, an unincorporated community
 Melrose, Massachusetts, a city located in the Greater Boston metropolitan area
 Melrose, Minnesota, a city
 Melrose, New Jersey, an unincorporated community
 Melrose, New Mexico, a village
 Melrose, New York, a hamlet of the Town of Schaghticoke
 Melrose, Bronx, a residential neighborhood in the New York City borough of the Bronx
 Melrose (Metro-North station)
 Melrose, Ohio, a village
 Melrose-Rugby, Roanoke, Virginia, a neighborhood in central Roanoke
 Melrose, Wisconsin, a village
 Melrose (town), Wisconsin, a town
 Melrose Township (disambiguation)

Registered historic places:
 Melrose (Danville, Kentucky) in listed on the NRHP in Boyle County, Kentucky
 Melrose (Natchez, Mississippi), a mansion in Natchez National Historical Park
 Melrose (Murfreesboro, North Carolina) in listed on the NRHP in Hertford County, North Carolina
 Melrose (Cheyney, Pennsylvania) in Cheyney, Pennsylvania
 Melrose (Casanova, Virginia), listed on the NRHP in Fauquier County, Virginia
 Melrose (Fork Union, Virginia), listed on the NRHP in Fluvanna County, Virginia

Other uses
 Melrose (name)
 Melrose plc, a British investment company
 Melrose (apple), an apple cultivar
 Melrose (ferry), a San Francisco Bay ferry operating from 1909 to 1931
 Melrose (store), a clothing store in the Southwest United States
 Melrose (album), a 1990 album by Tangerine Dream

See also
 Chronicle of Melrose, a medieval chronicle likely written by monks at Melrose Abbey
 Melrose Apartments (disambiguation), 
 Melrose High School (disambiguation)
 Melrose Park (disambiguation)
 Melrose Place, a 1990s TV soap opera